John Hunt Morgan (June 1, 1825 – September 4, 1864) was an American soldier who served as a Confederate  general in the American Civil War of 1861–1865. 

In April 1862, Morgan raised the 2nd Kentucky Cavalry Regiment (CSA) and fought in the Battle of Shiloh (April 6 to 7, 1862) in  Tennessee. He next launched a costly raid in  Kentucky, which encouraged Confederate General Braxton Bragg's invasion of that state in August 1862. He also attacked the supply lines of Union General William Rosecrans. 

In July 1863, he set out on a  raid into  Indiana and Ohio, where he took hundreds of prisoners. But after Union gunboats intercepted most of his men, Morgan surrendered at Salineville, Ohio, following the Battle of Salineville. His point of surrender is the northernmost point ever reached by uniformed Confederates. This notorious "Morgan's Raid", carried out against orders, gained no tactical advantage for the Confederacy, while the loss of his regiment proved a serious setback. However, some historians, such as Shelby Foote, argue that the raid and related distraction of Union forces allowed Bragg's Army to escape Middle Tennessee without much harassment. 

Morgan escaped from Union prison but his credibility remained low. The Confederate Army restricted him to minor operations. He was killed at Greeneville, Tennessee, in September 1864.

Early life and career
John Hunt Morgan was born in Huntsville, Alabama in 1825, the eldest of ten children of Calvin and Henrietta (Hunt) Morgan. His father claimed to be a  descendant of Revolutionary War general and hero Daniel Morgan. 

He was a maternal grandson of John Wesley Hunt, an early founder of Lexington, Kentucky, and one of the first millionaires west of the Allegheny Mountains. Although carrying a middle name after that grandfather, Morgan did not use the middle name of Hunt during his life. Historians came to refer to him with three names in the postwar years. 

Hunt was a leading landowner and businessman in Kentucky. "His business empire included interest in banking, horse breeding, agriculture and hemp manufacturing. Among his business associates were Henry Clay and John Jacob Astor." 

The paternal grandfather Luther Morgan and his wife Anna (Cameron) Morgan had come to Huntsville but retained properties in Kentucky. A downturn in the cotton economy forced him to mortgage his holdings. John's father, Calvin Morgan, encountered financial difficulties at the same time; his pharmacy failed and, unable to pay property taxes, he lost his Huntsville home in 1831. He moved his family to Lexington, where Calvin managed one of his father-in-law Hunt's sprawling farms.

Morgan grew up on the farm outside Lexington and attended Transylvania College for two years, but was suspended in 1844 for dueling with a fraternity brother. In 1846, Morgan became a Freemason, at Daviess Lodge #22, Lexington. Morgan desired a military career, but the small size of the US military severely limited opportunities for officers' commissions.

In 1846 Morgan enlisted with his brother Calvin and uncle Alexander in the U.S. Army as a cavalry private during the Mexican–American War. He was elected second lieutenant and was promoted to first lieutenant before arriving in Mexico, where he saw combat in the Battle of Buena Vista. 

On his return to Kentucky, he became a hemp manufacturer. In 1848, at the age of 23, he married Rebecca Gratz Bruce, the 18-year-old sister of one of his business partners. After his grandfather John Wesley Hunt died in 1849, Morgan's fortunes greatly improved: his mother Henrietta began financing his business ventures with money from her inheritance.

In 1853, Rebecca Morgan delivered a stillborn son. She contracted septic thrombophlebitis, popularly known as "milk leg", an infection of a blood clot in a vein, which eventually led to an amputation. They became increasingly emotionally distant from one another. Morgan was Known as a gambler and womanizer, but also for his generosity. He had at least one slave son, Sidney Morgan, by an enslaved woman. John H. Morgan was the biological grandfather of African-American Garrett Morgan (1877-1963), who became a notable inventor.

Morgan remained interested in the military. He raised a militia artillery company in 1852, but it was disbanded by the state legislature two years later. In 1857, with the rise of sectional tensions, Morgan raised an independent infantry company known as the "Lexington Rifles" and spent much of his free time drilling his men. 

In 1859 his sister Kitty (Dolly) Morgan McClung, a young widow, married A. P. Hill, a future Confederate general. His sister Henriette Hunt Morgan married Basil W. Duke, who also became a Confederate general and was second in command to Morgan.

Civil War service

Like most other Kentuckians, Morgan did not initially support secession. Immediately after Abraham Lincoln's election in November 1860, he wrote to his brother, Thomas Hunt Morgan, then a student at Kenyon College in northern Ohio, "Our State will not I hope secede I have no doubt but Lincoln will make a good President, at least we ought to give him a fair trial & then if he commits some overt act all the South will be a unit." Kentucky officially proclaimed its neutrality the following year. 

By the following spring, Tom Morgan, who also had opposed Kentucky's secession, had transferred home to the Kentucky Military Institute, where he began to support the Confederacy. Just before the Fourth of July, he left and took a steamer to enlist in the Kentucky State Guard at Camp Boone in Tennessee. 

Morgan stayed at home in Lexington to tend to his troubled business and his ailing wife Becky, who died on July 21, 1861.

In September, Captain Morgan and his militia company went to Tennessee and joined the Confederate States Army. Morgan soon raised the 2nd Kentucky Cavalry Regiment and became its colonel on April 4, 1862.

Morgan and his cavalrymen fought at the Battle of Shiloh at Shiloh in southern Tennessee on April 6–7, 1862. He soon became a symbol to secessionists in their hopes for obtaining Kentucky for the Confederacy. A Louisiana writer, Robert D. Patrick, compared Morgan to Revolutionary War officer Francis Marion and wrote that "a few thousands of such men as his would regain us Kentucky and Tennessee."

In his first Kentucky raid, Morgan left Knoxville, Tennessee on July 4, 1862, with almost 900 men and in three weeks swept through Kentucky, deep in the rear of Major General Don Carlos Buell's army. He reported the capture of 1,200 federal soldiers, whom he paroled, acquired several hundred horses, and destroyed massive quantities of supplies. 

He unnerved Kentucky's Union military government, and President Lincoln received so many frantic appeals for help that he complained "they are having a stampede in Kentucky." Historian Kenneth W. Noe wrote that Morgan's feat "in many ways surpassed Major General J. E. B. Stuart's celebrated 'Ride around (Union Major General George B.) McClellan' and the Union Army of the Potomac the previous spring." The success of Morgan's raid was one of the key reasons that the Confederate Heartland Offensive of Gen. Bragg and Gen. Edmund Kirby Smith was launched later that fall; they believed that tens of thousands of Kentuckians would enlist in the Confederate Army if they invaded the state.

As a colonel, Morgan was presented with a Palmetto Armory pistol by the widow of Brigadier General Barnard Elliott Bee Jr. That pistol is now owned by the Museum of the American Civil War.

Morgan was promoted to brigadier general (his highest rank) on December 11, 1862, though the Promotion Orders were not signed by President Davis until December 14, 1862. He received the thanks of the Confederate Congress on May 1, 1863, for his raids on the supply lines of Union Major General William S. Rosecrans in December and January, most notably his victory at the Battle of Hartsville on December 7.

On December 14, 1862, Morgan married again, to Martha "Mattie" Ready, the daughter of Tennessee United States Representative Charles Ready and his wife.  Through her mother's family she was a cousin of William T. Haskell, a former U.S. representative from Tennessee.

Morgan's Raid

Hoping to divert Union troops and resources in conjunction with the twin Confederate operations of  Vicksburg and  Gettysburg in the summer of 1863, Morgan set off on the campaign that would become known as "Morgan's Raid". Morgan crossed the Ohio River and raided across southern Indiana and Ohio. At Corydon, Indiana, the raiders met 450 local Home Guard in the Battle of Corydon that resulted in eleven Confederates killed and five Home Guard killed.

In July, at Versailles, Indiana, while soldiers raided nearby militia and looted county and city treasuries, the jewels of the local masonic lodge were stolen. When Morgan, a Freemason, learned of the theft, he recovered the jewels and returned them to the lodge the following day.

After several more skirmishes, during which he captured and paroled thousands of Union soldiers, Morgan's raid almost ended on July 19, 1863, at Buffington Island, Ohio, when approximately 700 of his men were captured while trying to cross the Ohio River into West Virginia. Intercepted by Union gunboats, over 300 of his men succeeded in crossing. Most of Morgan's men captured that day spent the rest of the war in the infamous Camp Douglas Prisoner of War camp in Chicago, which had a very high death rate.

On July 26, near Salineville, Ohio, Morgan and his exhausted, hungry and saddlesore soldiers were  finally forced to surrender. It was the farthest north that any uniformed Confederate troops would penetrate during the war.

On November 27, Morgan and six of his officers, most notably Thomas Hines, escaped from their cells in the Ohio Penitentiary by digging a tunnel from Hines' cell into the inner yard and then ascending a wall with a rope made from bunk coverlets and a bent poker iron. Shortly after midnight Morgan and three of his officers  boarded a train from the nearby Columbus train station; they arrived in Cincinnati that morning. Morgan and Hines jumped from the train before reaching the depot, and escaped into Kentucky by hiring a skiff to take them across the Ohio River. Through the assistance of sympathizers, they eventually made it to safety in the South. Coincidentally, the same day Morgan escaped, his wife gave birth to a daughter, who died shortly afterwards - before Morgan returned home.

Though Morgan's Raid was breathlessly followed by the Northern and Southern press and caused the Union leadership considerable concern, it is now regarded as little more than a showy but ultimately futile sidelight to the war. Furthermore, it was done in direct violation of Morgan's orders from General Braxton Bragg not to cross the river. Despite the raiders' best efforts, Union forces had amassed nearly 110,000 militia in Illinois, Indiana and Ohio; dozens of United States Navy gunboats along the Ohio; and strong Federal cavalry forces, which doomed the raid from the beginning. The cost of the raid to the Federals was extensive, with claims for compensation still being filed against the U.S. government well into the early-20th century. However, the Confederacy's loss of Morgan's light cavalry far outweighed the benefits achieved by the raid.

Late career and death
After his return from Ohio, Morgan returned to active duty. However, the men he was assigned were in no way comparable to those he had lost. Morgan once again began raiding into Kentucky. However his men lacked discipline, and he was unwilling or unable to control them, leading to open pillaging along with high casualties. The raids of this season were in risky defiance of a strategic situation in the border states that had changed radically from the year before. Union military occupation of this region, long denied to major Confederate armies, had progressed to the point that even highly mobile raiders could no longer count on easily evading them. Northern public outrage at Morgan's raid across the Ohio River may well have contributed to this state of affairs.

His "Last Kentucky Raid" was carried out in June 1864, the high-water mark of which was the Second Battle of Cynthiana. After winning a minor victory on June 11 against an inferior infantry unit in the engagement known as the Battle of Keller's Bridge on the Licking River, near Cynthiana, Kentucky, Morgan decided to take a chance the following day on another contest against superior Union mounted forces that were known to be approaching. The result was a disaster for the Confederates, resulting in the destruction of Morgan's force as a cohesive unit, only a small fraction of whom escaped with their lives and liberty as fugitives, including the general and some of his officers.

After the flashy but unauthorized 1863 Ohio raid, Morgan was never again trusted by General Bragg. Nevertheless, on August 22, 1864, Morgan was placed in command of the Trans-Allegheny Department, embracing at the time the Confederate forces in eastern Tennessee and southwestern Virginia. Yet around this time some Confederate authorities were quietly investigating Morgan for charges of criminal banditry, likely leading to his removal from command. He began to organize a raid aimed at Knoxville, Tennessee.

On September 4, 1864, he was surprised by a Union raid on Greeneville, Tennessee. While attempting to retreat, he was shot in the back and killed by Union cavalrymen. Morgan's body was returned to Kentucky and he was buried in Lexington Cemetery.

Family
After he remarried, he and his wife Mattie had two daughters together. The second was born soon after his death in 1864.

His brother Thomas Hunt Morgan had a son born in 1866. That nephew became a notable geneticist.

Legacy

 Hart County High School, in Munfordville, Kentucky, the site of the Battle for the Bridge, named its mascot the Raiders, in honor of Morgan's men. Also, a large mural in the town depicts Morgan.
 Trimble County High School, in Bedford, Kentucky, named its mascot the Raiders, in honor of Morgan's men.
 The John Hunt Morgan Memorial statue in Lexington is a tribute to him. The statue was relocated from the courthouse lawn in July 2018, as this was the former site of slave auctions in the city. It was placed in the Confederate section of the Lexington Cemetery. 
 The Hunt-Morgan House, once his home, is a contributing property in a historic district in Lexington.
 The John Hunt Morgan Bridge on East Main Street/U.S. Route 11 in Abingdon, Virginia, is named after him.
 The John Hunt Morgan Bridge on South Main Street/U.S. Route 27 in Cynthiana, Kentucky, is named after him.
 The General Morgan Inn, the location where he was killed in Greeneville, Tennessee, is named after him.
 A Kentucky Army National Guard Field Artillery battalion, the 1st BN 623d FA (HIMARS) with headquarters in Glasgow, Kentucky, are known as Morgan's Men.
 Morgan House Gift Shop and Restaurant, in Dublin, Ohio, is where the Morgan family's original log cabin was moved.
 A stone monument was erected in West Point, Ohio in 1909 to commemorate General Rue's victory and capture of Morgan. It was erected by Will L. Thompson of East Liverpool. It states:

See also

 List of American Civil War generals (Confederate)
 List of Notable Freemasons
 Alvan Cullem Gillem
 Battle of Buffington Island
 Battle of Corydon
 Battle of Salineville
 Guerrilla warfare
 Kentucky in the American Civil War
 Garrett Augustus Morgan
 Thomas Hunt Morgan – nephew of John Hunt Morgan who won the 1933 Nobel Prize in Medicine
 William P. Sanders

Notes

Sources
 Brown, Dee A., The Bold Cavaliers: Morgan's Second Kentucky Cavalry Raiders. 1959. Republished as Morgan's Raiders, Smithmark, 1995. .
 Dupuy, Trevor N., Johnson, Curt, and Bongard, David L., Harper Encyclopedia of Military Biography, Castle Books, 1992, 1st Ed., .
 Evans, Harold. Who Made America:  From the Steam Engine to the Search Engine.  Little Brown, 2004. 
 Eicher, John H., and David J. Eicher, Civil War High Commands. Stanford: Stanford University Press, 2001. .
 Foote, Shelby. The Civil War: A Narrative. Vol. 3, Red River to Appomattox. New York: Random House, 1974. .
 Horwitz, Lester V., The Longest Raid of the Civil War, Farmcourt Publishing, 1999, .
 Mackey, Robert E. The Uncivil War: Irregular Warfare in the Upper South, 1861–1865. Norman, OK, University of Oklahoma Press, 2004. .
 Noe, Kenneth W. Perryville: This Grand Havoc of Battle. Lexington: University Press of Kentucky, 2001. .
 Ramage, James A. Rebel Raider: The Life of General John Hunt Morgan. Lexington: University Press of Kentucky, 1986. .
 Sifakis, Stewart. Who Was Who in the Civil War. New York: Facts On File, 1988. .
 Warner, Ezra J. Generals in Gray: Lives of the Confederate Commanders. Baton Rouge: Louisiana State University Press, 1959. .

Further reading
 Duke, Basil W., Morgan's Cavalry New York, 1906.
 Gorin-Smith, Betty Jane, 'Morgan Is Coming!': Confederate Raiders in the Heartland of Kentucky. Louisville, Kentucky: Harmony House Publishers, 2006, 452 pp., .
 Johnson, Robert Underwood, and Buel, Clarence C. (eds.), Battles and Leaders of the Civil War, Century Co., 1884-1888.
 Mowery, David L., Morgan's Great Raid: The Remarkable Expedition from Kentucky to Ohio. Charleston, SC: History Press, 2013. .
 Rue, George Washington, Maj. (1828-1911): Celebration of the Surrender of General John H. Morgan, Ohio Archæological and Historical Society Publications: Volume 20 [1911], pp. 368–377.
 Penn, William A., Kentucky Rebel Town: Civil War Battles of Cynthiana and Harrison County, (Lexington: U. Press of Kentucky, 2016)

External links

 The History of the Thunderbolt Raiders by journalists Lee Bailey and John Hambrick
 John Hunt Morgan Heritage Trail
 "The Battle of Corydon, Indiana" – Article by Civil War historian/author Bryan S. Bush, which contains rare images of Morgan shown courtesy of the Civil War Museum of the Western Theater in Bardstown, Kentucky.
 "Morgan's Christmas Raid" – Article by Civil War historian/author Bryan S. Bush
 

1825 births
1864 deaths
Military personnel from Huntsville, Alabama
American people of Welsh descent
American slave owners
Confederate States Army brigadier generals
American military personnel of the Mexican–American War
Confederate States of America military personnel killed in the American Civil War
American Civil War prisoners of war
American Freemasons
Lexington in the American Civil War
Orphan Brigade
People of Kentucky in the American Civil War
Transylvania University alumni
Deaths by firearm in Tennessee